God's Favorite Customer (or Mr Tillman's Wild Ride) is the fourth studio album by American musician Josh Tillman under the stage name Father John Misty. It was released by Sub Pop and Bella Union on June 1, 2018. The album was primarily produced by Tillman himself and Jonathan Rado, alongside a variety of collaborators including previous engineers Trevor Spencer and Dave Cerminara, with further production contributions by Tillman's long-time producer Jonathan Wilson. It also features a variety of musical collaborators, including The Haxan Cloak, Mark Ronson, Weyes Blood, and members of Tillman's touring band.

Background and release
On July 23, 2017, during an Australian concert in support of his previous album Pure Comedy, Tillman announced that he was soon to be mixing his next album, which he jokingly referred to as Pure Comedy 2. In an interview with NME, Tillman revealed that the album was mostly written on the toilet and was "pretty much done", with the exception of a synth bass part on one song. He announced that the album was to be self-produced, and would not follow a singular concept, like his previous albums, which he referred to as "pretentious". He also revealed that the album would include ten tracks, with "sprightly" tempos.

Tillman teased potential song titles from the album on November 16, including "Ouch, I’m Drowning”, “Dum Dum Blues”, “Mr Tillman, Please Exit The Lobby” and “Well, We’re Only People And There’s Nothing Much We Can Do About It”, revealing that "most of this next album was written in a six-week period where I was kind of on the straits", whilst living in a hotel for two months. He noted that the album was about "misadventure", and summarised it as "a heartache album", inspired by an event in which his "life blew up".

Tillman debuted the track "Mr. Tillman" on September 6, performing it acoustically at Third Man Records in Nashville, Tennessee. On February 15, 2018, he debuted the song with a live band in Tokyo, and released it as the album's lead single five days later.

Tillman revealed the album's title on April 17, 2018, as well as its release date and track listing. He also shared the tracks "Disappointing Diamonds Are the Rarest of Them All" and "Just Dumb Enough to Try" the following day. The album was erroneously made available to stream for a short period of time on Apple Music on April 18 before being removed.

Critical reception

On Metacritic, which assigns a normalized rating out of 100 to reviews from mainstream publications, God's Favorite Customer has an average score of 83 based on 29 reviews, indicating "universal acclaim".

Reviewing the album for AllMusic, Stephen Thomas Erlewine stated that, "Compared to Pure Comedy... God's Favorite Customer feels light and breezy. That's intentional, of course. Father John Misty never makes a move that isn't considered, and God's Favorite Customer is designed to be the digestif after a multi-course feast: a palette cleanser that riffs upon the flavors lingering on the tongue."  In The A.V. Club, Matt Williams wrote that the album's "intimacy and honesty results in some of Tillman’s most stunning songwriting". Similarly Robin Murray wrote for NME that "in remaining tight-lipped, this taciturn new aspect to Father John Misty might be his most genuinely sincere, and his most profound". Jeremy D. Larson of Pitchfork noted that the album "exhibits a new sense of empathy and vulnerability while losing none of his wit". Writing for Rolling Stone, David Fricke compared the album to the works of John Lennon in the 1970s, concluding that "What lifts God's Favorite Customer beyond homage is Tillman's slicing, free-associative candor as he examines the cost in sanity and constancy of his craft and touring life". Leah Greenblatt of Entertainment Weekly felt that in its best moments, the album shows Tillman to be a "master of classic melody, even if the source is meta, and something like a true poet when he wants to be".

In Consequence of Sound, Steven Edelstone wrote that God's Favorite Customer is Tillman's "most succinct effort yet, rarely ever breaking from the album’s overall narrative", and that "his most brutally honest lyrics are his most profound", but criticised the diminishing presence of Tillman's "trademark sense of humor" that had previously "separated him from the rest of the singer-songwriter pack". In a less positive review for Spin, Joshua Copperman stated that "the album shines when the humor returns" but concluded that "we're stuck with a record that’s both intentionally and unintentionally frustrating", writing that Tillman "doesn’t come to any greater conclusion than "We're Only People"", criticising the album's closing song.

Track listing

Notes
  signifies "very special thanks".

Personnel
Credits adapted from liner notes and Qobuz.

Musicians
 Josh Tillman – guitar , drums , tambourine , bass , piano , finger picking , Mellotron , harmonica , sleigh bells , additional instrumentation , string arrangement 
 Jonathan Rado – bass , guitar , DX-1  piano , synthesizer , organ 
 Jon Titterington – piano , glockenspiel , synthesizer , accordion , trumpet , Wurlitzer 
 Bobby Krlic – strings , horns 
 Jonathan Wilson – bass synthesizer , Crumar , organ , electric 
 Elijah Thomson – bass , solo 
 Gabe Noel – cellos , lap steel , string arrangement 
 Mark Ronson – bass 
 David Vandervelde – guitars 
 James King – saxophone 
 Natalie Mering – vocals 

Technical
 Josh Tillman – production, mixing
 Jonathan Rado – production 
 Dave Cerminara – production , mixing
 Trevor Spencer – production 
 Jonathan Wilson – additional production , mixing
 Ivan Wayman – engineering 

Artwork
 Josh Tillman – art direction
 Sasha Barr – art direction
 Pari Dukovic – cover photo

Charts

References

2018 albums
Josh Tillman albums
Bella Union albums
Sub Pop albums
Albums produced by Jonathan Rado